The piping plover (Charadrius melodus) is a small sand-colored, sparrow-sized shorebird that nests and feeds along coastal sand and gravel beaches in North America. The adult has yellow-orange-red legs, a black band across the forehead from eye to eye, and a black stripe running along the breast line. This chest band is usually thicker in males during the breeding season, and it is the only reliable way to tell the sexes apart. The bird is difficult to see when it is standing still, as it blends well with open, sandy beach habitats. It typically runs in short, quick spurts and then stops.

There are two subspecies of piping plovers: the eastern population is known as Charadrius melodus melodus and the mid-west population is known as C. m. circumcinctus. The bird's name is derived from its plaintive bell-like whistles which are often heard before the bird is visible.

Total population is currently estimated to be between 7600 - 8400 individuals. Intensive conservation efforts have yielded slow population growth, but it is expected that this trend would reverse if conservation efforts were stopped. As of 1986, the U.S. Fish & Wildlife Service lists the Great Lakes population as endangered and the Northern Great Plains and Atlantic populations as threatened.

Their breeding habitat includes beaches and sand flats on the Atlantic coast, the shores of the Great Lakes, and in the mid-west of Canada and the United States. They nest on sandy or gravel beaches or shoals. These shorebirds forage for food on beaches, usually by sight, moving across the beaches in short bursts. Generally, piping plovers will forage for food around the high tide wrack zone and along the water's edge. They eat mainly insects, marine worms, and crustaceans.

Taxonomy
American naturalist George Ord described the piping plover in 1824. Two subspecies are recognized, including nominate C. m. melodus of the Atlantic Coast and C. m. circumcinctus of the Great Plains. On average, circumcinctus is darker overall with more contrastingly dark cheeks and lores. Breeding circumcinctus males show more extensive black on forehead and bill-base and more often shows complete breast-bands. Some overlap exists.

Description

The piping plover is a stout bird with a large rounded head, a short thick neck, and a stubby bill. It is a sand-colored, dull gray/khaki, sparrow-sized shorebird. The adult has yellow-orange legs, the male has a prominent black band across the forehead from eye to eye, and a black ring around the neck during the breeding season. The band on the female's brow is much fainter. During nonbreeding season, the black bands become less pronounced. Its bill is orange with a black tip.

Vocalizations
The piping plover's light call is a soft, whistled peep peep given by standing and flying birds. Its frequently heard alarm call is a soft pee-werp, which the second syllable lower pitched.

Distribution and habitat 
The piping plover lives the majority of its life on open sandy beaches or rocky shores, often in high, dry sections away from water. They can be found on the Atlantic Coast of the U.S. and Canada on the ocean or bay beaches and on the Great Lakes shores. It builds its nests higher on the shore near beach grass and other objects. It is very rare to see a piping plover anywhere outside of sand or rocky beaches/shores while not migrating. Piping plovers are often found to migrate south to The Bahamas during winter months. They have also been recorded across Cuba, with rarer occurrences elsewhere throughout the West Indies, and even Ecuador and Venezuela.

Piping plovers migrate from their northern range in the summer to the south in the winter months, migrating to the Gulf of Mexico, the southern Atlantic coast of the United States and the Caribbean. They begin migrating north in mid-March. Their breeding grounds extend from southern Newfoundland south to the northern parts of South Carolina. Migration south begins in August for some adults and fledglings, and by mid-September most piping plovers have headed south for winter.

Behavior

Breeding

The piping plover usually arrives at sandy beaches to breed in mid to late April.

Males will begin claiming territories and pairing up in late March. When pairs are formed, the male begins digging out several scrapes (nests) along the high shore near the beach-grass line. The males also perform elaborate courtship ceremonies, including stone tossing and courtship flights featuring repeated dives. Scrapes, small depressions in the sand dug by kicking the sand, are often in the same area that least terns choose to colonize. Females will sit and evaluate the scrapes, then choose a good scrape and decorate the nest with shells and debris to camouflage it. Once a scrape is seen as sufficient, the female will allow the male to copulate with her. The male begins a mating ritual of standing upright and "marching" towards the female, puffing himself up and quickly stomping his legs. If the female had seen the scrape as adequate, she will allow the male to stand on her back and copulation occurs within a few minutes.

Most first-time nest attempts in each breeding season are four-egg nests which appear as early as mid-to-late April. Females lay one egg every other day. Second, third and sometimes fourth nesting attempts may have only three or two eggs. Incubation of the nest is shared by both the male and the female. Incubation is generally 27 days and eggs usually all hatch on the same day.

After chicks hatch, they are able to feed within hours. The adults' role is then to protect them from the elements by brooding them. They also alert them to any danger. Like many other species of plovers, adult piping plovers will often feign a "broken wing display", drawing attention to themselves and away from the chicks when a predator may be threatening the chicks' safety. The broken wing display is also used during the nesting period to distract predators from the nest. A major defense mechanism of the chicks is their ability to blend in with the sand. It takes about 30 days before chicks achieve flight capability. They must be able to fly at least  before they can be considered fledglings.

To protect the nests from predators during incubation, many conservationists use exclosures, such as round turkey-wire cages with screened tops. These allow the adults to move in and out but stop predators from getting to the eggs. After the chicks hatch, many areas will put up snow fencing to restrict driving and pets for the safety of the chicks. Threats to nests include crows, cats, raccoons, and foxes, among others. Exclosures are not always used, as they occasionally draw more attention to the nest than would occur without the exclosure. Natural hazards to eggs or chicks include storms, high winds, and abnormal high tides; human disturbances can cause the abandonment of nests and chicks as well. It is best to stay away from any bird that appears distressed to prevent any unintended consequences.

Status and conservation
The piping plover is globally threatened and endangered; it is uncommon and local within its range, and has been listed by the United States as "endangered" in the Great Lakes region and "threatened" in the remainder of its breeding range. While it is federally threatened, the piping plover has been listed as state endangered in Illinois, Indiana, Iowa, Maine, Michigan, Minnesota, Nebraska, New Hampshire, New York, New Jersey, Ohio, Pennsylvania, and Wisconsin.  The Parker River Refuge on Plum Island, Massachusetts is a national network of lands and rivers dedicated to the safety of its native wildlife and specifically the Piping Plover.  Protecting the Piper with full beach closures, the Refuge now "has the second largest plover population on the [Massachusetts] North Shore".

In eastern Canada, the piping plover is found only on coastal beaches. In 1985, it was declared an endangered species by the Committee on the Status of Endangered Wildlife in Canada. A large population in Ontario has disappeared entirely. In 2008, however, piping plover nests were found at Wasaga Beach and near Sauble Beach, Ontario, along the Ontario Great Lakes shores. There is also some evidence of nesting at other sites in Ontario, including Port Elgin, Ontario in 2014.

In the 19th century and early 20th century, the piping plover was utilized for its feathers, as were many other birds at the time, as decorations for women's hats. These decorations, called plumes, became a symbol of high society, especially those from larger rare birds. This practice led to its initial population decline. The Migratory Bird Treaty Act of 1918 helped the population recover through the 1930s. The second decline in the piping plover's population and range has been attributed to increased development, shoreline stabilization efforts, habitat loss and human activity near nesting sites in the decades following World War II. The Great Lakes populations eventually shrank to only around two dozen. On the Missouri River sandbars, the number of breeding individuals varied, with the population increasing from 2012 to 2017 following a major habitat creation event.

Critical nesting habitats are now being protected to help the population during its breeding season. Populations have seen significant increases since the protection programs began, but the species remains in serious danger. Current conservation strategies include identification and preservation of known nesting sites; public education; limiting or preventing pedestrian and/or off-road vehicle (ORV) traffic near nests and hatched chicks; limiting predation of free-ranging cats, dogs and other pets on breeding pairs, eggs and chicks; and removal of foxes, raccoons, skunks, and other predators.

In coastal areas such as Plymouth, Cape Cod, Long Island, Sandy Hook, Cape Henlopen State Park in Delaware, North Manitou Island in Lake Michigan, and most recently, Cape Hatteras National Seashore on the Outer Banks of North Carolina, beach access to pedestrians and off-road vehicles has been limited to protect piping plovers and their chicks at critical times of the breeding season.

Various environmental organizations are involved in aiding restoration efforts. The Goldenrod Foundation unsuccessfully filed suit against the Town of Plymouth in 2010 and 2015 to restrict offroad vehicle access to breeding habitat.

In 2019, the first documented pair of piping plovers in Chicago nested at Montrose Beach. The pair, named Monty and Rose by locals, hatched three chicks in July, becoming the first within Cook County in 60 years. Threats to the nest and chicks included a planned music festival that was canceled to ensure the birds were protected. Monty and Rose returned to the area in 2020 and 2021, again laying eggs and hatching chicks, although some eggs and chicks were lost to natural predators. In May 2022, the male shorebird, Monty, died after returning to Montrose Beach.

Climate change 
As shorebirds, piping plovers may be highly impacted by climate change, as it affects their aquatic and their terrestrial habitats.

Inland habitat water level rise 
A main part of the piping plover’s range is in the Prairie Pothole Region of South Dakota, North Dakota, and Canada. The shallow wetlands of this region fluctuate water surface area in response to wet-dry periods. Piping plovers who breed in this region depend on the decreased water levels to reveal shorelines that they use for nesting. Climate change, along with consolidation drainage, drainage of smaller wetlands into another wetland to create fewer, larger wetlands, has begun to create fuller wetlands, reducing shoreline nesting habitat. Research of 32 piping plover wetland habitats in this region found that wetlands with risen water levels had lower chances of piping plover presence. This suggests that the warming climate and increased water levels and precipitation will degrade piping plover breeding habitats in the Prairie Pothole Region.

Coastal habitat sea level rise 
Climate change is also causing sea level rise, which may affect the piping plover's other main habitat, the Atlantic Coast of the U.S. and Canada. Research has assessed sea level rise’s threat to the piping plover habitat on barrier islands in Long Island, New York, finding that sea level rise will reduce piping plover breeding areas. Breeding habitats have the potential to migrate inland, but would still be reduced as a result of human development, which would reduce the migrated habitat 5-12%. This may lead to conflict between piping plover habitat conservation and human recreation because sea level rise will make the habitats take up a larger proportion of the islands. Research also shows that a large hurricane with the risen sea levels could flood up to 95% of piping plover habitat, so increased coastal storms induced by climate change, combined with rising sea level, could be very damaging.

Similar research has been conducted on the Florida coastline, part of the piping plovers’s Atlantic coast habitat, to evaluate the habitat’s sensitivity to sea level rise caused by climate change. Florida coastline species are at particular risk to climate change because of not just sea level rise, but also increased tropical storms. The piping plover depends on this habitat because it migrates south from its breeding habitats to winter in Florida for about three months. It is predicted that there will be a 16% loss of coastal landforms from inundation by the year 2100. Further, the sea level rise may make the coastline more complex, which may produce more habitat fragmentation. Thus, the changing landforms of the Florida coastline will likely affect piping plover ecology. Research also shows that of the shorebird species affected by the Florida coastline transformation, piping plovers are at high risk of decline.

Increased sand temperatures 
Higher sand temperatures also directly affect piping plovers. Piping plovers nest on the ground in open areas, which regularly subjects them to high temperatures. Because of these high temperatures, piping plovers (along with other ground-nesting bird species) have specific strategies and behaviors for thermal regulation of their nests and themselves. Research has been conducted to evaluate how sand temperature affects piping plover nesting behaviors in a population of piping plovers in North Dakota during the 2014-2015 breeding seasons. As sand temperatures increased, piping plover nest attendance decreased and the frequency and duration of daily shading behaviors increased. Rising ground temperatures will likely have significant effects on piping plovers' ground-nesting behavior.

References

External links

 Critical Habitat for Piping Plover (Charadrius melodus) – US Fish & Wildlife Service
 Piping plover species account - Cornell Lab of Ornithology
 Piping plover - Charadrius melodus - USGS Patuxent Bird Identification InfoCenter
 Illustrated Guide to Shorebirds of Cape Cod National Seashore – US National Park Service
 Cape Cod Times: Plovers take flight, beach reopens, August 16, 2007
 
 
 
 
 

Piping plover
Shorebirds
Native birds of the Canadian Prairies
Native birds of Eastern Canada
Native birds of the Eastern United States
Native birds of the Plains-Midwest (United States)
Birds described in 1824
Taxa named by George Ord